Lobuya is a rural locality (a selo), and one of two settlements in the Town of Srednekolymsk of Srednekolymsky District in the Sakha Republic, Russia, in addition to Srednekolymsk, the administrative center of the district. Its population as of the 2010 Census was 3, of whom all three were male, down from 8 recorded during the 2002 Census.

References

Notes

Sources
Official website of the Sakha Republic. Registry of the Administrative-Territorial Divisions of the Sakha Republic. Srednekolymsky District. 

Rural localities in Srednekolymsky District